The Alcoholic Beverages Control Commission is a Massachusetts state government agency responsible for licensing or permitting participants in the alcoholic beverages industry in Massachusetts. It licenses manufacturers of alcoholic beverages, wholesalers and importers and out-of-state suppliers of alcoholic beverages. Additionally, brokers, salesman, warehouses, planes, trains, ships, ship chandlers and motor vehicles transporting alcoholic beverages in Massachusetts require licensing. The Commission also approves the granting of every retail pouring or package store license application allowed by a city or town.

State alcohol agencies of the United States
Alcoholic Beverage Control Commission